Romeritos is a Mexican dish from Central Mexico, consisting of tender sprigs of seepweed (Suaeda spp.) which are boiled and served in a mole sauce seasoned with shrimp jerky blended into the mix. Typical additional ingredients include boiled potatoes, nopales and re-hydrated shrimp. They are usually served with patties of dried shrimp with bread slices and in tacos. They are traditionally enjoyed at Christmas and Lent.

The type of seepweed used depends on the region. The plant is known as romerito in Spanish. That name in English means  "little rosemary"; some seepweed species can vaguely resemble such plant when fresh but neither taste nor smell similar in any way.

See also
 List of Mexican dishes
 Suaeda pulvinata

References

Christmas food
Mexican cuisine